The Taff Vale Railway H class was a class of three 0-6-0T steam tank locomotives designed by Tom Hurry Riches, built by Kitson & Co. and introduced to the Taff Vale Railway in 1884. They were primarily used on the Pwllyrhebog Colliery Incline, and had special tapered boilers for this purpose.

Numbering

Withdrawal and disposal
193 was used by the NCB at the Tar distillation plant, Wernddu, Caerphilly; it was scrapped in January 1960. 194 was also used at Wernddu Tar plant, and was scrapped at Swindon.

See also
 Locomotives of the Great Western Railway

References
 pp. K169–K171

H
0-6-0T locomotives
Railway locomotives introduced in 1884
Kitson locomotives
Standard gauge steam locomotives of Great Britain
Scrapped locomotives
Freight locomotives